Imran Khan was sworn in as the Prime Minister of Pakistan on 18 August 2018 at the Aiwan-e-Sadr in Islamabad. His cabinet consisted of sixteen ministers and five advisors. He kept portfolio of interior ministry to himself. In his celebration speech before swearing in and the inaugural speech after swearing-in he mentioned that he will build and run Pakistan on principles of first Islamic state of Medina.

Background
A cricket hero and legend, Khan started his campaign for prime ministership in 1996 with launch of a political party called Pakistan Tehreek-e-Insaf. His party did not have much of a success in 1997 Pakistani general election and 2002 Pakistani general election. He boycotted 2008 Pakistani general election. His first major victory came in 2013 Pakistani general election when his party won an outright majority in Khyber Pakhtunkhwa forming a coalition government in the province and became second largest party nationally by popular vote.

First 100 days

In May 2018, Khan's party announced a 100 day agenda for a possible future government. The agenda included sweeping reforms in almost all areas of government including creation of a new province in Southern Punjab, fast tracking of merger of Federally Administered Tribal Areas into Khyber Pakhtunkhwa, betterment of law and order situation in Karachi, and betterment of relations with Baloch political leaders.

Similar measures were announced in his inaugural speech. In addition to the measures announced in 100 day agenda, Khan announced some groundbreaking austerity measures where he vowed to reduce the staff and number of luxury vehicles of prime minister house to two employees and two vehicles respectively from current number of hundreds.

See also
 List of international prime ministerial trips made by Imran Khan

References

 
Khan, Imran
Imran Khan